Chertovitsy is a rural locality (a selo) in Aydarovskoye Rural Settlement, Ramonsky District, Voronezh Oblast, Russia. The population was 1,199 as of 2010. There are 37 streets.

Geography 
Chertovitsy is located 23 km southwest of Ramon (the district's administrative centre) by road. Solnechny is the nearest rural locality.

References 

Rural localities in Ramonsky District